Dipeptidyl-peptidase III (dipeptidyl aminopeptidase III, dipeptidyl arylamidase III, enkephalinase B, red cell angiotensinase) is an enzyme. This enzyme catalyses the following chemical reaction

 Release of an N-terminal dipeptide from a peptide comprising four or more residues, with broad specificity. Also acts on dipeptidyl 2-naphthylamides.

This cytosolic peptidase that is active at neutral pH.

References

External links 
 

EC 3.4.14